James Assion Wright (August 11, 1902 – November 7, 1963) was an American lawyer and politician from Pennsylvania who served two terms in the U.S. Congress from 1941 to 1945.

Wright was born in Carnegie, Pennsylvania.  He graduated from the College of the Holy Cross in Worcester, Massachusetts in 1923 and from the University of Pittsburgh School of Law in Pittsburgh, Pennsylvania, in 1927.  He served as assistant county solicitor of Allegheny County, Pennsylvania, from 1935 to 1941.

Wright was elected as a Democrat to the Seventy-seventh and Seventy-eighth Congresses.  He was an unsuccessful candidate for reelection in 1944.

He died in 1963.

Sources

The Political Graveyard

1902 births
1963 deaths
College of the Holy Cross alumni
Pennsylvania lawyers
Democratic Party members of the United States House of Representatives from Pennsylvania
University of Pittsburgh School of Law alumni
People from Carnegie, Pennsylvania
20th-century American lawyers
20th-century American politicians